Malti Joshi (born 4 June 1934) is an Indian novelist, essayist, and writer, who writes primarily in the Hindi and Marathi languages. She was awarded the Padma Shri, one of India's highest civilian honours, in 2018.

Life 
Joshi was born in 1934, in Aurangabad, Maharashtra, and was educated in Madhya Pradesh, graduating from Holkar College, Dr, Bhimrao Ambedkar University, in Indore. Her family spoke Marathi at home, but she was educated primarily in Hindi. Following her undergraduate education, she earned a master's degree in arts in Hindi literature, in 1956.

Writing 
Joshi began writing poetry and short stories as a teenager, contributing to Hindi children's magazines such as Parag. In 1971, she published a short story in the Hindi literature magazine, Dharmayug, which was then produced by the Times group. She continued to publish stories in several well-circulated Hindi magazines, including Saptahik Hindustan, Manorama, Kadambini, and Sarika. Joshi also participated the practice of kathakathan, or oral recitation, performing her stories for audiences in live settings. Her stories have been collected and published in several volumes, and she has also written two novels, publishing fifty books in all.

Joshi's work has been translated to Urdu, Bengali, Tamil, Telugu, Punjabi, Malayalam, and Kannada. Her works have been translated to English, Russian, and Japanese.  In addition to her short story collections, which were primarily written in Hindi, she has published eleven books in Marathi.

Some of Joshi's stories were later adapted by the Indian government broadcaster, Doordarshan, for television. They featured as part of the television show 'सात फेरे' (Seven Turns) produced by Jaya Bachchan, and 'किरदार' ('Character') produced by Gulzar.

In an interview with Aaj Tak, a Hindi-language news channel, Joshi stated that she drew her characters from her family and social circle, preferring to narrate the experience of middle-class families in India. She cited Amritlal Nagar, P. L. Deshpande, and Sharad Joshi as some of her influences.

Awards

References 

1943 births
Living people
Recipients of the Padma Shri in literature & education
People from Aurangabad, Maharashtra
Indian writers
Indian women novelists
Hindi-language writers
Marathi-language writers
Writers from Maharashtra
Writers from Madhya Pradesh
20th-century Indian women writers
20th-century Indian writers